Comanche Independent School District is a public school district based in Comanche, Texas (USA).

Located in Comanche County, a very small portion of the district extends into Mills County.

In 2009, the school district was rated "academically acceptable" by the Texas Education Agency.

Schools
Comanche High School (Grades 9-12)
Jefferies Junior High School (Grades 7-8)
Comanche Middle School (Grades 4-6)
Comanche Elementary School (Grades PK-5)

High school
The High school's principal is Vincent Pierce.

Between the 2007-2008 and the 2008-2009 school years, Comanche High School moved from UIL conference 3A to conference 2A.

References

External links
Comanche ISD

School districts in Comanche County, Texas
School districts in Mills County, Texas